Janina Natusiewicz-Mirer (1 January 1940 – 10 April 2010) was a Polish activist.

She died in the 2010 Polish Air Force Tu-154 crash near Smolensk on 10 April 2010. She was posthumously awarded the Order of Polonia Restituta.

References

External links
Webpage about Janina Natusiewicz-Mirer

1940 births
2010 deaths
20th-century Polish archaeologists
Polish women archaeologists
Polish art historians
Women historians
Polish activists
Polish women activists
Polish dissidents
Polish deportees to Soviet Union
University of Wrocław alumni
Knights of the Order of Polonia Restituta
Victims of the Smolensk air disaster
20th-century Polish women writers